The College of Design at the Georgia Institute of Technology, established in 1908 as the Department of Architecture and also formerly called the College of Architecture, offered the first four-year course of study in architecture in the Southern United States.

History

The history of the College of Design spans over 100 years. The Department of Architecture was formed in 1908, and granted its first degree in 1911. It was renamed the School of Architecture after World War II, and elevated to a full-fledged College of Architecture in 1975. In 2016, it was renamed the College of Design in order to more accurately reflect the breadth of programs the College offers, and to reduce confusion between the College of Architecture and its component School of Architecture. For most of the 20th century, the Architecture curriculum was  mostly Harvard graduates (until 1975).

In 1908, Georgia Tech (as the "Georgia School of Technology") formally began teaching architecture, when Preston A. Hopkins of Boston was appointed to teach the entering class of 20 students and organize the curriculum. The new Department of Architecture, although small, was equal in rank to other academic departments of engineering at Tech. Francis Palmer Smith (B.S. Univ. of Pennsylvania 1907) was selected as the first department head in 1909. In 1911, the first degrees, the Bachelor of Science in Architecture, were granted.  This event placed Georgia Tech among the earliest public universities in the U. S. to offer an architecture degree. By 1912, the Department of Architecture grew to 42 full-time students with three faculty members.

By 1930, the Architecture department had 132 full-time students, awarded 20 degrees, and had six full-time with six part-time faculty. The curriculum during the early years was closely allied with engineering, and the subject of construction was strongly emphasized. By the 1930s, the influence of the Beaux-Arts, formerly a dominant force in architectural education nationally, had begun to decline as the sway of Bauhaus increased. The department did not have the post-professional graduate program or an option for architectural engineering, both of which were contained in over half of the architecture schools at the time. Architectural education was mainly a product of local concerns in Atlanta, in Georgia and the South, in accordance with the mission of the Georgia School of Technology. In 1934, the five-year Bachelor of Architecture degree was created to conform with the requirements of the increasingly influential Association of Collegiate Schools of Architecture (ACSA). Under the leadership of Bush-Brown, the Architecture students declined to 66 during the depression, reached a low of 22 students during World War II, and then exploded to 462 post-war students.

In 1948, the new School of Architecture was formed and made parallel to other professional schools within the newly renamed Georgia Institute of Technology. In 1952, the School of Architecture building, designed by Bush-Brown, Gailey and Heffernan, was constructed, creating a separate identity for the school, with a highly professional curriculum. In 1975, the College of Architecture was formed to handle increased enrollment and strengthening of allied disciplines. William Fash (Oklahoma State University, M.ARCH, 1960) was appointed as first dean of Architecture in 1976. In 1975, with respect to its international thrust, the college's Paris Program was established by P. M. Heffernan. Originally located at the Ecole d'Architecture Paris Tolbiac and moved to the Ecole d'Architecture Paris la Villette, the Program provides for a full year of study for architecture students during their senior year of undergraduate study. In 1992, a Division of Fine Arts was created in the College of Architecture, leading to a new Arts and Technology Program for course work in the areas of music, visual arts, and multimedia.

In 1995, the Center for Geographic Information Systems (CGIS) was created.  The CGIS has worked on projects for the 1999 Color Infra-Red (CIR) Digital Ortho Photo Program, for the Georgia GIS Data Clearinghouse, for the NWI-Wetlands statewide digital wetland database with GIS tools, for the Trees Atlanta-Greenspace Acquisition Support System, the U.S. Environmental Protection Agency-Air Quality, natural hazards, hydrography, and for infrastructure management.

In 2008, the Georgia Tech Center for Music Technology (GTCMT) was established as an interdisciplinary research center.

Schools within the College of Design
 School of Architecture
 Building Construction : School of Building Construction
 City & Regional Planning : School of City and Regional Planning
 Industrial Design : School of Industrial Design
 Music : School of Music

Facilities

The College of Design occupies several buildings and spaces throughout campus, the center of which are the two main buildings - College of Architecture East and West - in the center of the campus on Fourth Street.
College of Architecture East Building
Constructed in 1952 as the college's first home
Designed by the firm Bush-Brown, Gailey, and Heffernan, a firm composed two former program leaders
Contains College Auditorium, City and Regional Planning program office, and PhD program office
Studio and computer labs used for Industrial Design and Architecture programs
College of Design Wood Shop
College of Architecture West Building
Constructed in 1979 with classrooms and jury space around a large, open atrium
Contains Dean's Office, Architecture program office, Industrial Design program office, and Architecture Library
Studio and computer labs used for Common First Year, Industrial Design, and Architecture programs
John and Joyce Caddell Building
Located behind West Building
Contains Building Construction program office and Center for GIS 
Hinman Building
Located behind of the Georgia Tech Library to the north
Couch Building
Located on West Campus, amongst residence halls
Houses Music Department offices, performance, and practice space
Formerly contained Under the Couch, a student-operated music club, which has since been relocated to the Student Center
The "Church"
Located on 10th Street
Contains Center for Assistive Technology and Environmental AccessDigital Fabrication Lab (DFL) (formerly Advanced Woods Product Laboratory (AWPL))
Located on Marietta Street
Contains wood and metal workshops along with a couple of CNC machines

Degrees
A complete list is available on the College of Design website.

Undergraduate
 B.S. in Architecture - A four-year, pre-professional program in Architecture (not B.Arch.)
 B.S. in Industrial Design B.S. in Music TechnologyGraduate
 Master of Architecture 3.5-year track - A professional program in Architecture for students who earned a non-architecture undergraduate degree.
 Master of Architecture 2-year track - A professional program in Architecture for students who earned an undergraduate degree in architecture. 
 M.S. with concentrations in:
 Advanced Production
 Building Construction and Facility Management
 Building Information and Systems
 Design and Health
 Design Computation
 High Performance Buildings
 Human-Computer Interaction
 Geographic Information Science & Technology
 M.S. in Urban Design
 M. City and Regional Planning Master of Industrial Design (MID) - 2-year and 3-year track
 M.S. in Music TechnologyPostgraduate
 Ph.D.''' with concentrations in:
 Building Construction and Integrated Facility Management
 Building Technology
 City & Regional Planning
 Culture and Behavior
 Design Cognition
 Design Computing
 History, Theory and Criticism
 Morphology and Design

Notable College of Design alumni

References

External links
College of Design
Article on the College of Architecture from the New Georgia Encyclopedia

College of Design
Architecture schools in Georgia (U.S. state)
Educational institutions established in 1908
1908 establishments in Georgia (U.S. state)